Tanja Schwander is a Swiss evolutionary biologist and professor at the University of Lausanne. She is known for her work on the Evolution of sexual reproduction.

Education and career
Tanja Schwander obtained her PhD in 2007 from the University of Lausanne on 'Evolution, maintenance and ecological consequences of genetic caste determination in Pogonomyrmex harvester ants'. Tanja Schwander then took a postdoctoral position at Simon Fraser University in Prof. Bernard J. Crespi's lab, before being hired as an independent researcher at the University of Groningen.  In 2013, she moved back to University of Lausanne to begin her own research group.

Work

Tanja Schwander's work has focused on understanding the consequences of asexuality using Timema stick insects as a model system. Her work has contributed to the current understanding of the Evolution of sexual reproduction, the Paradox of Sex, and Sexual conflict.

Awards
 2009. John Maynard Smith Prize of the European Society for Evolutionary Biology
 2020. European Research Council Consolidator Grant

Notable publications
 "Molecular evidence for ancient asexuality in Timema stick insects", Current Biology
 "Deleterious mutation accumulation in asexual Timema stick insects", Molecular Biology and Evolution
 "Neutral and selection-driven decay of sexual traits in asexual stick insects", Proceedings of the Royal Society B: Biological Sciences
 "Consequences of asexuality in natural populations: insights from stick insects", Molecular Biology and Evolution

References

Swiss biologists
Swiss women academics
Evolutionary biologists
University of Lausanne alumni
Academic staff of the University of Lausanne
1978 births
Living people
Women evolutionary biologists